Lego The Incredibles is a 2018 action-adventure game developed by TT Fusion and published by Warner Bros. Interactive Entertainment. The game is based on the films The Incredibles (2004) and Incredibles 2 (2018). It was released on 15 June 2018 in North America and on 13 July in Europe on Nintendo Switch, PlayStation 4, Windows, and Xbox One.

A macOS version of the game was developed and published by Feral Interactive on 21 November.

Gameplay
The gameplay is very similar to the previous Lego installments, with puzzles designed for younger players, various waves of fighting enemies and two-player cooperative gameplay. The game allows the player to control various super-heroes and villains alike from both films (including supers that have appeared in neither film but are listed in the National Supers Agency database in the special features of The Incredibles DVD release), each with their own special abilities and superpowers. For example, Mr. Incredible has super-strength and invulnerability, Elastigirl can shape her body in many ways, Violet can turn invisible and create force fields, Dash can run at incredible speeds, and Jack-Jack has a large variety of powers, just like in the films, such as turning into a human torch, telekinesis and teleportation, to name a few. The game also includes various characters from other Pixar films, such as Flik from A Bug's Life,  Merida from Brave, Lightning McQueen from Cars, James P. "Sulley" Sullivan from  Monsters, Inc. and Woody from Toy Story.

The open-world of the game is set in two fictional cities, Municiberg and New Urbem, which are situated very close to each other. Apart from the typical gold bricks puzzles, quests and challenges, the game adds a new feature called the Crime Wave, where the player travels to a specific area of one of the cities which is under assault from a super-villain and their minions. The player must complete all the quests given by the people in the area to complete the Crime Wave. Usually, the final quest involves defeating the super-villain. There are ten Crime Waves in total and five super-villains to defeat: three from the films (Bomb Voyage, the Underminer, and Syndrome) and two original characters, exclusive to the game (the Brainfreezer and Anchor-Man). Like other Lego titles, Lego The Incredibles allows players to create their own custom character with different powers and abilities.

The game received a single downloadable content pack, "Parr Family Vacation", which adds the Parr family and Lucius in vacation clothes to the character roster. The DLC wasn't available to players on the Nintendo Switch until later.

Plot
The game's story closely follows the plot of both The Incredibles and Incredibles 2, though with numerous humorous deviations. The game begins with the events of the second film, which the player must complete before gaining access to that of the first film. There are also several major changes to both films' storylines, such as Mr. Incredible being aided by Frozone in fighting the first Omnidroid on the Nomanisan island (there are two Omnidroids in the boss battle), Gazerbeam surviving and helping Mr. Incredible sneak inside into the secret room, or Syndrome being simply defeated when Jack Jack's power activates and going into hiding rather than dying after being sucked into his jet's engine.

Reception

Lego The Incredibles received "mixed or average" reviews from critics, on Metacritic. The PlayStation 4 version received a 70 out of 100, while the Nintendo Switch version received a 65 out of 100. Push Square rated the game a 6 out of 10 stars.

The game was nominated for "Fan Favorite Family-Friendly Multiplayer Game" at the Gamers' Choice Awards, for "Favorite Video Game" at the 2019 Kids' Choice Awards, and for "Family" at the 15th British Academy Games Awards.

Notes

References

External links
 

2018 video games
Action-adventure games
Incredibles, The
Disney video games
Sentient toys in fiction
Split-screen multiplayer games
Superhero crossover video games
Open-world video games
PlayStation 4 games
Traveller's Tales games
The Incredibles video games
Video games developed in the United Kingdom
Video games set in the United States
Video games set on fictional islands
Warner Bros. video games
Windows games
Nintendo Switch games
Xbox One games
3D platform games
Video games scored by Ian Livingstone
Video games scored by Rob Westwood
Feral Interactive games
Multiplayer and single-player video games